The 1936 Balham and Tooting by-election was held on 23 July 1936.  The by-election was held after the incumbent Conservative MP, Sir Alfred Butt, 1st Baronet resigned in June 1936 over a scandal concerning a leak of budget details from which he was believed to have benefitted financially.  It was won by the Conservative candidate George Doland.

References

Balham and Tooting by-election
Balham and Tooting,1936
Balham and Tooting by-election
Balham and Tooting,1936
Balham
Tooting
Balham and Tooting by-election